The Kyushu K10W Type 2 Land based intermediate trainer (Code Named Oak by the Allies) was a single engine low wing fixed undercarriage monoplane training aircraft which served in the Imperial Japanese Navy Air Service in the latter part of World War II.

Design and development
It was designed by the Kyushu Aircraft Company to the 14-Shi Intermediate Trainer specification of mid 1939 which required a design similar to the North American NA-16 following the Mitsubishi's purchase of an NA-16-4R and an NA-16-4RW on behalf of the Japanese Navy. Design work commenced in January 1940 and the first prototype was ready by April 1941. Despite the similarity of the K10W to other contemporary Japanese aircraft such as the Tachikawa Ki-55 and Mitsubishi Ki-51, it suffered from stall and stability problems that resulted in 16 pre-production testing aircraft being built. Work at Kyuhsu on the Q1W maritime patrol bomber and K11W carrier crew trainer were given a higher priority. Kyushu would build only nine production aircraft before production was transferred in 1943 to Nippon Hikoki (a small company that did a lot of subcontract work), who in turn built 150 examples before production ended in August 1944.

The Japanese had purchased two NA-16's and western sources have long believed that the K10W1 was a development of these, however a close study of the Oak, as it was code named by the Allies, shows that they shared nothing beyond a similar configuration.

Whereas the NA-16's featured a steel tube structure covered with metal or fabric panels, the K10W1 was of flush riveted stressed skin construction throughout (excepting the fabric covered control surfaces) with a slightly smaller wingspan, narrower chord wings, a longer fuselage and a higher aspect ratio tailplane. The entire cockpit was further forward and the wings were swept forward rather than aft as on the NA-16. In addition, controls were run internally, and footrests retracted rather than being fixed. A version of the K10W built from wood was planned as the K10W2 but was never built.

Operational service
The K10W1 was not popular with crews possibly due to ongoing handling problems and only served with a small number of units which included the Oi, Go, Takarazuka and 81st Kokutais (Naval Air Groups) as trainers. Japanese records do not show that any were used for Kamikaze attacks, although a small number were definitely used as target tugs for gunnery training and as unit hacks attached to operational bases where they probably assisted in getting new pilots up to speed.

Specifications (K10W1)

See also

References

Notes

Bibliography

World War II Japanese trainer aircraft
1940s Japanese military trainer aircraft
Kyūshū aircraft
Single-engined tractor aircraft
Low-wing aircraft
Aircraft first flown in 1941